The San Francisco Giants are an American professional baseball team based in San Francisco. The Giants compete in Major League Baseball (MLB) as a member club of the National League (NL) West division. Founded in 1883 as the New York Gothams, the team was renamed the New York Giants three years later, eventually relocating from New York City to San Francisco in 1958.

The franchise is one of the oldest and most successful in professional baseball, with more wins than any team in the history of major American sports. The team was the first major-league organization based in New York City, most memorably playing home games at several iterations of the Polo Grounds. The Giants have played in the World Series 20 times. In 2014, the Giants won their then-record 23rd National League pennant; this mark has since been equaled and then eclipsed by the rival Dodgers, who as of 2022 lay claim to 24 NL crowns. The Giants' eight World Series championships are second-most in the NL and fifth-most of any franchise.

The franchise won 17 pennants and five World Series championships while in New York, led by managers John McGraw, Bill Terry, and Leo Durocher. New York-era star players including Christy Mathewson, Carl Hubbell, Mel Ott, and Willie Mays join 63 other Giants in the Baseball Hall of Fame, the most of any franchise. The Giants' rivalry with the Los Angeles Dodgers, one of the longest-standing and most famed rivalries in American sports, began in New York and continued when both teams relocated to the West Coast in 1958.

Despite the efforts of Mays and Barry Bonds, regarded as two of baseball's all-time best players, the Giants endured a 56-year championships drought following the move west, a stretch that included three World Series losses. The drought finally ended in the early 2010s; under manager Bruce Bochy, the Giants embraced sabremetrics and eventually formed a baseball dynasty that saw them win the World Series in 2010, 2012, and 2014, making the Giants the second team in NL history to win three championships in five years.

Through 2022, the franchise's all-time record is 11,382-9,854. The team's manager is Gabe Kapler.

Franchise history

New York Giants

The Giants originated in New York City as the New York Gothams in 1883, and were known as the New York Giants from 1885 until the team relocated to San Francisco after the 1957 season. During most of their 75 seasons in New York City, the Giants played home games at various incarnations of the Polo Grounds in Upper Manhattan.

Numerous inductees of the National Baseball Hall of Fame and Museum played for the New York Giants, including John McGraw, Christy Mathewson, Mel Ott, Bill Terry, Willie Mays, Monte Irvin, and Travis Jackson. During the club's tenure in New York, they produced five of the franchise's eight World Series wins (1905, 1921, 1922, 1933, 1954) and 17 of its 23 National League pennants. Famous moments in the Giants' New York history include the 1922 World Series, in which the Giants swept the Yankees in four games, the 1951 home run by New York Giants outfielder and third baseman Bobby Thomson known as the "Shot Heard 'Round the World", and the defensive feat by Mays during Game 1 of the 1954 World Series known as "the Catch".

The Giants had intense rivalries with their fellow New York teams, the New York Yankees and the Brooklyn Dodgers.  The Giants faced the Yankees in six World Series and played the league rival Dodgers multiple times per season. Games between any two of these three teams were known collectively as the Subway Series. The Dodgers-Giants rivalry continues, as both teams moved to California after the 1957 season, with the Dodgers relocating to Los Angeles. The New York Giants of the National Football League (NFL) are named after the team.

San Francisco Giants 

The Giants, along with their rival Los Angeles Dodgers, became the first Major League Baseball teams to play on the West Coast. On April 15, 1958, the Giants played their first game in San Francisco, defeating the former Brooklyn and now Los Angeles Dodgers, 8–0.  The Giants played for two seasons at Seals Stadium (from 1931 to 1957, the stadium was the home of the PCL's San Francisco Seals) before moving to Candlestick Park in 1960.  The Giants played at Candlestick Park until 1999, before opening Pacific Bell Park (now known as Oracle Park) in 2000, where the Giants currently play.

The Giants struggled to sustain consistent success in their first 50 years in San Francisco.  They made nine playoff appearances and won three NL pennants between 1958 and 2009.  The Giants lost the 1962 World Series in seven games to the New York Yankees. The Giants were swept in the 1989 World Series by their cross-Bay rival Oakland Athletics, a series best known for the 1989 Loma Prieta earthquake, which caused a 10-day delay between Games 2 and 3.  The Giants also lost the 2002 World Series to the Anaheim Angels.  One of the team's biggest highlights during this time was the 2001 season, in which outfielder Barry Bonds hit 73 home runs, breaking the record for most home runs in a season. In 2007, Bonds would surpass Hank Aaron's career record of 755 home runs.  Bonds finished his career with 762 home runs (586 hit with the Giants), which is still the MLB record.

The Giants won three World Series championships in 2010, 2012, and 2014, giving the team eight total World Series titles, including the five won as the New York Giants.

Players inducted into the National Baseball Hall of Fame and Museum as members of the San Francisco Giants include CF Willie Mays, 1B Orlando Cepeda, P Juan Marichal, 1B Willie McCovey, and P Gaylord Perry.

Uniforms

1958–1972
Upon moving to San Francisco, the Giants kept the same uniform they wore in New York, save for two changes. The cap logo now had an interlocking "SF" in orange, while the road uniform now featured "San Francisco" in black block letters with orange trim. Neckline, pants and sleeves feature thin black and orange stripes.

1973–1976
Changing to double-knit polyester, the Giants made a few noticeable changes to their uniform. The color scheme on the letters was changed to orange with black trim, and player names were added on the back. The cap logo remained the same.

1977–1982
For the 1977 season, the Giants switched to pullover uniforms. "Giants" on the home uniform was changed from serifed block lettering to cursive script, and the color scheme returned to black with orange trim. The road uniform became orange, with letters in black with white trim. Neck and sleeve stripes are in black, orange and white. Both uniforms received chest numbers. The standard cap was changed to feature an orange brim.

The 1978 season saw the Giants add a black alternate uniform, an inverse of their road orange uniform. All three uniforms now featured the "Giants" script previously exclusive to the home uniform.

1983–1993
Before the 1983 season, the Giants returned to a traditional buttoned uniform. This design returned to the classic look they wore early in their San Francisco tenure, but with a few exceptions. The lettering became more rounded (save for the player's name), the neck stripes were removed, and the interlocking "SF" and black piping was added on the road gray uniform. The caps returned to an all-black design.

1994–1999
In 1994, the Giants made a few changes to their uniform. The road uniform reverted to "San Francisco" in front and removed the piping. The front of both uniforms returned to stylized block letters with pointed edges, but kept the rounded numbers. The "SF" on the cap was also changed to reflect the lettering change.

2000–present
Coinciding with the move to Oracle Park (then Pacific Bell Park) in 2000, the Giants unveiled new uniforms which were aesthetically close to the style they originally wore in their early years. On each uniform, numbers returned to a block letter style.

Home
The base of the home uniform was changed to cream. The "Giants" wordmark kept the same stylized block letter treatment but the arrangement was changed from a vertical to a radial arch. Neck stripes also returned with this uniform. Gold drop shadows were also added. A left sleeve patch containing the team logo and the words "San Francisco Baseball Club" was also featured.

Road
The gray road uniform returned to the classic "San Francisco" wordmark used in the 1960s, though in 2005 gold drop shadows were also added. This uniform was then tweaked to include black piping in 2012. Two sleeve patches were used. Between 2000 and 2010, the patch featured "SF" in orange letters in front of a baseball, with the full name added within a black circle. In 2011, this was changed to the sleeve patch used on the home uniform. Until 2020, only the road uniform featured player names; since 2021, all Giants uniforms have player names on the back.

Black alternate
In 2001, the Giants added a road and home alternate black uniform. Each uniform shared the same design as their home and road counterparts, with the exception of the road alternate receiving gold drop shadows. The home design was dropped after only one season, and the road version was retired the following year. Both sets were worn with an all-black cap but with the squatchee in black (the primary cap has an orange squatchee) and the "SF" wordmark changed to black with orange trim.

In 2015, the Giants unveiled a new black alternate uniform to be used on select Saturday home games. This set has the interlocking "SF" in front along with orange piping and a new sleeve patch containing the Golden Gate Bridge atop the "Giants" wordmark. Initially, the letters were in black with orange trim, but this was changed to orange with black trim and orange drop shadows.

Orange alternate
Before the 2010 season, the Giants unveiled a new orange alternate uniform to be used on Friday home games. Initially, this design was similar to the home uniform save for a trim change to cream, but in 2011, the sleeve patch was changed to the one previously used on the team's road uniform. In 2014, the orange alternate were tweaked slightly, adding black piping and a new sleeve patch featuring the interlocking "SF" logo, and returning to the script "Giants" lettering previously used in the late 1970s. This design is usually paired with a black cap with orange brim featuring the "SF" logo.

Road alternate
Between 2012 and 2019, the Giants wore a second gray road uniform. This design was similar to the primary roads, but with the "SF" in place of the city name (a nod to the 1983–1993 road uniforms).

City Connect
In 2021, Major League Baseball and Nike introduced the "City Connect" program, with teams wearing special uniforms that reflect the pride and personality of their community. The Giants' version is a white base with orange accents, featuring the stylized "G" in an orange/white gradient. The gradient represents the San Francisco fog that envelopes the Bay Area many months per year. An orange silhouette of the Golden Gate Bridge is printed on the sleeves. The uniform is paired with an all-orange cap with the "SF" in orange with white trim. The uniforms are usually worn on Tuesday home games.

Rivalries
The Giants' rivalry with the Los Angeles Dodgers dates back to when the two teams were based in New York, as does their rivalry with the New York Yankees. The Dodger and Giants rivalry is one of the longest rivalries in sports history. Their rivalry with the Oakland Athletics dates back to when the Giants were in New York and the A's were in Philadelphia and played each other in the 1905, 1911, & 1913 World Series, and was renewed in 1968 when the Athletics moved from Kansas City and the teams again played each other in the earthquake-interrupted 1989 Bay Bridge World Series. The 2010 NLCS inaugurated a Giants rivalry with the Philadelphia Phillies after confrontations between Jonathan Sánchez and Chase Utley, and between Ramón Ramírez and Shane Victorino. However, with the Philadelphia Phillies dropping off as one of the premier teams of the National League, this rivalry has died down since 2010 and 2011. Another rivalry that has intensified recently is with the St. Louis Cardinals, whom the team has faced 4 times in the NLCS.

The rivalry between the New York Giants and Chicago Cubs in the early 20th century was once regarded as one of the most heated in baseball, with Merkle's Boner leading to a 1908 season-ending matchup in New York of particular note. That historical rivalry was revisited when the Giants beat the Cubs in the 1989 NL playoffs, in their tiebreaker game in Chicago at the end of the 1998 season, and on June 6, 2012, in a "Turn Back The Century" game in which both teams wore replica 1912 uniforms.

Los Angeles Dodgers

The Giants-Dodgers rivalry is one of the longest-standing rivalries in team sports.

The Giants-Dodgers feud began in the late 19th century when both clubs were based in New York City, with the Dodgers based in Brooklyn and the Giants playing at the Polo Grounds in upper Manhattan. After the 1957 season, Dodgers owner Walter O'Malley decided to move the team to Los Angeles primarily for financial reasons. Along the way, he managed to convince Giants owner Horace Stoneham (who was considering moving his team to Minnesota) to preserve the rivalry by taking his team to San Francisco as well. New York baseball fans were stunned and heartbroken by the move. Given that the cities of Los Angeles and San Francisco have long been competitors in economic, cultural and political arenas, their new California venues became fertile ground for transplantation of the ancient rivalry. In the wake of the Giants' and Dodgers' leaving New York, a new ballclub was born in 1962 in Queens: The New York Mets. The team's colors (blue and orange) were an homage to the recently departed teams.

Both teams' having endured for over a century while leaping across an entire continent, as well as the rivalry's growth from cross-city to cross-state, have led to its being considered one of the greatest in sports history.

The Giants-Dodgers rivalry has seen both teams enjoy periods of success at the expense of the other. While the Giants have more total wins, head-to-head wins, and World Series titles in their franchise histories, the Dodgers have won the National League West 11 more times than the Giants since the start of division play in 1969. Both teams have made the postseason as a National League wild card twice. The Giants won their first world championship in California in 2010, while the Dodgers won their last world title in 2020. As of the end of the 2020 baseball season, the Los Angeles Dodgers lead the San Francisco Giants in California World Series triumphs, 6–3, whereas in 20th-century New York, the Giants led the Dodgers in World Series championships, 5–1. The combined franchise histories give the Giants an 8–7 edge in MLB championships, overall.

Oakland Athletics

A geographic rivalry with the cross-Bay American League Athletics greatly increased with the 1989 World Series, nicknamed the "Battle of the Bay", which Oakland swept (and which was interrupted by the Loma Prieta earthquake moments before the scheduled start of Game 3 in San Francisco). In addition, the introduction of interleague play in 1997 has pitted the two teams against each other for usually six games every season since 1997, three in each city (but only four in 2013, two in each city). Before 1997, they played each other only in Cactus League spring training. Their interleague play wins and losses (63–57 in favor of the A's) have been fairly evenly divided despite differences in league, style of play, stadium, payroll, fan base stereotypes, media coverage and World Series records, all of which have heightened the rivalry in recent years. The intensity of the rivalry and how it is understood varies among Bay Area fans. A's fans generally view the Giants as a hated rival, while Giants fans generally view the A's as a friendly rival much lower on the scale. This is most likely due to the A's lack of a historical rival, while the Giants have their heated rivalry with the Dodgers. Some Bay Area fans are fans of both teams. The "split hats" that feature the logos of both teams best embodies the shared fan base. Other Bay Area fans view the competition between the two teams as a "friendly rivalry", with little actual hatred compared to similar ones such as the Subway Series (New York Mets vs. New York Yankees), the Red Line Series (Chicago Cubs vs. Chicago White Sox) and the Freeway Series (Los Angeles Dodgers vs. Los Angeles Angels).

The Giants and A's enjoyed a limited rivalry at the start of the 20th century before the Yankees began to dominate after the acquisition of Babe Ruth in 1920, when the Giants were in New York and the A's were in Philadelphia. The teams were managed by legendary leaders John McGraw and Connie Mack, who were considered not only friendly rivals but the premier managers during that era, especially in view of their longevity (Mack for 50 years, McGraw for 30) since both were majority owners. Each team played in five of the first 15 World Series (tying them with the Red Sox and Cubs for most World Series appearances during that time period). After becoming the San Francisco Giants and Oakland A's, they met in a fourth Series in  resulting in the A's last world championship (as of 2021).

New York Yankees

Though in different leagues, the Giants have also been historical rivals of the Yankees, starting in New York before the Giants moved to the West Coast. The teams have met five times in regular season interleague play:  In 2002 at the old Yankee Stadium, in 2007 at Oracle Park (then known as AT&T Park), in 2013 and 2016 at the current Yankee Stadium, and in 2019 at Oracle Park. The teams' next regular season meetings will occur in 2023.

In a September 2013 meeting, Yankees 3B Alex Rodriguez hit a grand slam, breaking Lou Gehrig's grand slam record.

In his July 4, 1939 farewell speech ending with the renowned "Today, I consider myself the luckiest man on the face of the earth", Yankee slugger Lou Gehrig, who played in 2,130 consecutive games, declared that the Giants were a team he "would give his right arm to beat, and vice versa".

Baseball Hall of Famers
As of 2021, the Major League Baseball Hall of Fame has inducted 66 representatives of the Giants (55 players and 11 managers) into the Hall of Fame, more than any other team in the history of baseball.

Ford C. Frick Award recipients

Other
The following inducted members of the Hall of Fame played or managed for the Giants, but either played for the Giants and were inducted as a manager having never managed the Giants, or managed the Giants and were inducted as a player having never played for the Giants:
 Cap Anson – inducted as player, managed Giants in 1898.
 Hughie Jennings – inducted as player, managed Giants from 1924 to 1925.
 Bill McKechnie – inducted as manager, played for Giants in 1916.
 Frank Robinson – inducted as player, managed Giants from 1981 to 1984.
 Casey Stengel – inducted as manager, played for Giants from 1921 to 1923.

Broadcasters Russ Hodges, Lon Simmons, and Jon Miller are permanently honored in the Hall's "Scribes & Mikemen" exhibit as a result of winning the Ford C. Frick Award in 1980, 2004, and 2010 respectively. As with all Frick Award winners, none are officially recognized as an inducted member of the Hall of Fame.

Bay Area Sports Hall of Famers

Wall of Famers

The Giants Wall of Fame recognizes retired players whose records stand highest among their teammates on the basis of longevity and achievements.

Those honored have played a minimum of nine seasons for the San Francisco Giants, or five seasons with at least one All-Star selection as a Giant.

Retired numbers

The Giants have retired 11 numbers in the history of the franchise, most recently Will Clark’s number 22 in 2022.

Of the Giants whose numbers have been retired, all but Bonds and Clark have been elected to the National Baseball Hall of Fame.  In 1944, Carl Hubbell (#11) became the first National Leaguer to have his number retired by his team.  Bill Terry (#3), Mel Ott (#4), and Hubbell played and/or managed their entire careers for the New York Giants. Willie Mays (#24) began his career in New York, moving with the Giants to San Francisco in 1958; he did not play in most of 1952 and all of 1953 due to his service in the Korean War. Mathewson and McGraw are honored by the Giants, but played in an era before uniform numbers became standard in baseball.

The Giants had originally scheduled to retire Will Clark's #22 on July 11, 2020, but the ceremony was postponed until July 30, 2022, due to the COVID-19 pandemic.

Also honored
John McGraw (3B, 1902–06; manager, 1902–32) and Christy Mathewson (P, 1900–16), who were members of the New York Giants before the introduction of uniform numbers, have the letters "NY" displayed in place of a number.

Broadcasters Lon Simmons (1958–73, 1976–78, 1996–2002 & 2006), Russ Hodges (1949–70), and Jon Miller (1997–current) are each represented by an old-style radio microphone displayed in place of a number.

The Giants present the Willie Mac Award annually to the player that best exemplifies the spirit and leadership shown by Willie McCovey throughout his career.

Team captains
The Giants have had a number of captains over the years:
 Jack Doyle 1902
 Dan McGann 1903–1907
 Larry Doyle 1908–16
 Gus Mancuso 1937–38
 Mel Ott 1939–47
 Alvin Dark 1950–56
 Willie Mays 1961–72
 Willie McCovey 1977–80
 Darrell Evans 1980–83
 Jack Clark 1984

Season records

All-time regular season record: 11,194–9,718 (.535) (through 2020 season)

Home stadiums

New York 

 Polo Grounds I (1883–1888)
 Oakland Park (1889)
 St. George Cricket Grounds (1889)
 Polo Grounds II (1889–1890)
 Polo Grounds III (1891–1957)
 Hilltop Park (1911 due to 1911 fire)

San Francisco 

 Seals Stadium (1958–1959 after moved to San Francisco)
 Candlestick Park (1960–1999)
 Oracle Park (2000–present)

Roster

Minor league affiliations

The San Francisco Giants farm system consists of eight minor league affiliates.

Radio and television

Giants' television telecasts are on NBC Sports Bay Area (cable) with select games simulcasted on KNTV (broadcast). KNTV's broadcast contract with the Giants began in 2008, one year after the team and KTVU mutually ended a relationship that dated to 1961. Jon Miller used to regularly call the action on KNTV, which used to be exclusive to the NBC Bay Area channel, while the announcing team for NBCSBA telecasts is Duane Kuiper and Mike Krukow, affectionately known as "Kruk and Kuip" (pronounced "Kruke" and "Kype"). During the 2016 season, the Giants had an average 4.71 rating and 117,000 viewers on primetime TV broadcasts. Since the 2022 season, as Krukow is unable to travel with the team due to his inclusion body myositis, the pair only work home games and select road games, which the road games are called from the NBC Sports Bay Area studio in downtown San Francisco. Shawn Estes, Javier López, and Hunter Pence serve as an alternate broadcast team for all other Giants road games.

The Giants' flagship radio station is KNBR (680 AM). KNBR's owner, Cumulus Media, is a limited partner in San Francisco Baseball Associates LP, the owner of the team. Jon Miller and Dave Flemming are the regular play-by-play announcers. Joe Ritzo serves as a backup play by play when Jon is absent and Dave is on TV. In addition to KNBR, the Giants can be heard throughout Northern California and parts of Nevada, Oregon, and Hawaii on the Giants Radio Network. Erwin Higueros and Tito Fuentes handle Spanish-language radio broadcasts on KXZM (93.7 FM).

Home run call glitch
On May 28, 2006, Flemming called the 715th career home run of Barry Bonds, which moved Bonds into second on the all-time home run list. Unfortunately, the power from Flemming's microphone to the transmitter cut off while the ball was in flight, so the radio audience heard only crowd noise. Greg Papa took over the broadcast and apologized to listeners. Kuiper's TV call was submitted to the Baseball Hall of Fame as an artifact, instead of the usual radio call.

Fight song and other music
First used for Giants radio broadcasts on KSFO, the team's fight song "Bye, Bye Baby!" is currently used following any Giants home run. The song is played in the stadium, and an instrumental version is played on telecasts when the inning in which the home run was hit concludes. The title and chorus "Bye bye baby!" coming from famed former Giants broadcaster Russ Hodges, which was his home run call.

Following a Giants home win, Tony Bennett's "I Left My Heart in San Francisco" is played in Oracle Park in celebration.

Uniform schedule
Giants 2021 uniform schedule:
Cream Home jerseys: Home games on Monday, Wednesday, Thursday, most Saturdays and Sunday.
Gray Road jerseys: Road games from Monday to Sunday.
Orange alternate jerseys: Every night game on Friday (known as Orange Friday).
Black alternate jerseys: Every fourth Saturday of the month (away game).
City Connect jerseys: Every Tuesday home game.

See also

 List of San Francisco Giants team records
 San Francisco Giants general managers and managers

References

General reference

External links

 
 San Francisco Giants Team History & Encyclopedia Baseball Reference
 Sports E-Cyclopedia San Francisco Giants Page History and Pictures
 Robert Lurie talks at the Commonwealth Club in 1976 about the process of keeping the Giants in San Francisco (from the Commonwealth Club records at the Hoover Institution)

 
 

 
Baseball teams established in 1883
Baseball teams in San Francisco
Major League Baseball teams
Cactus League